Yosef Zvi Rimon (born January 18, 1968) is an Israeli Religious Zionist rabbi, author, lecturer and Posek who serves as rabbi of the Gush Etzion Regional Council and the Ashkenazi Synagogue of Alon Shvut Darom. He is Rosh Yeshiva of the Jerusalem College of Technology (Machon Lev) and a Rosh Kollel at Yeshivat Har Etzion.

Biography
Yosef Zvi Rimon was born in Tel Aviv to Rita and David Rimon, the son of the poet Yosef Zvi Rimon, after whom he is named. He grew up in Tel Aviv, where he attended the Moriah School. He also attended Mechina in Givat Shmuel. He then studied at the Netiv Meir Yeshiva in Jerusalem for high school, and in 1986 he attended Yeshivat Har Etzion which was headed by Rav Yehuda Amital and Rav Aharon Lichtenstein. He served in the Armored Corps as part the Hesder system at Yeshivat Har Etzion. He was in a tank unit in the 188th Armored Brigade and described his army service as "a time that was at times exhausting and challenging, but also constructive and empowering." He subsequently completed a Bachelor of Education degree at Herzog College.

When Yeshivat HaHesder Yerucham was founded in 1993, Rav Rimon began to teach Halacha there. About a year later he married Sharon Blumenzweig, the daughter of Yerucham’s Rosh Yeshiva. They live in Alon Shvut and have eight children.

Rabbinic and pedagogic career
In 1995, he became a Rav at Yeshivat Har Etzion, and at the same time gave Shiurim to all yeshiva students on various halakhic topics. In 2000 he was appointed as head of the Yeshiva's Kollel Halacha. Today, Rav Rimon serves as the rabbi of the Ashkenazi synagogue of Alon Shvut Darom and teaches at Yeshivat Har Etzion, its sister school, Migdal Oz, and Herzog College.
Rimon heads the "Sulamot" association (formerly the "Halacha and Education Center"), which he founded. Sulamot deals with three main areas: Judaism, education and experience. In each area, the association deals with the promotion and refinement of Jewish content, in pedagogical aspects (writing halakhic content, creating study materials for education systems, etc.), in the experiential aspects (developing innovative learning systems, experiential secondary learning and in creating and strengthening ties with Jewish communities around the world.

Rimon hosts the children and youth television series "Ratzim LaMishnah" and appears in the series on a regular basis.

Following the Israeli disengagement from Gaza,  Rimon contributed to the rehabilitation of evacuees who were left without homes and jobs by founding the LaOfek association (also called Taasoktif and JobKatif). At first, the association was engaged in finding jobs for Gush Katif residents. The association was awarded the Ot Hanasi Lamitnadev (the President's Volunteer Award) for 2008. Since 2009, the association has worked in cooperation with the government, which covers 75% of its expenses. Today, the association is engaged in activities to promote underprivileged populations, finding jobs for soldiers, assisting Lone Soldiers and in special projects in Israeli society; it provides employment coaching and counseling, business mentoring, professional retraining courses, academic scholarships and other services.

In 2020 the Gush Etzion Regional Council searched for its first head rabbi. After a year-long process in which the general public nominated candidates, a committee of rabbis and public leaders from the area submitted their recommendations and Rimon was elected as Gush Etzion’s first Chief rabbi.* Rabbi of the Gush Etzion Regional Council (2021)

Rimon is a  popular lecturer in Israel, North America, the UK and Australia.

Rimon's Sifrei halakha are written in a way that is structured in "tracing [from] the sources to the practical application of Halacha in our modern reality." In his books, the halakhic sources are presented, sometimes from the Talmud and the Rishonim, sometimes only from the Achronim, depending on the subject. This approach, which stands in contrast to various halakhic books that bring only final rulings, tries to give the learner tools for understanding halakhah even in cases that are not directly addressed in halakhic rulings. His best-known book, "Halacha MiMekorah - Tzava" (Halacha From Its Source - Army), a Halachic work for soldiers fighting in a Jewish army, a subject which became much more practical with the creation of the Jewish State, was published in 2010.He is an expert on Shemitah.

He has written a Pesach Haggadah and a Yom Kippur Machzor.

Awards and recognition
 Moskowitz Prize for Zionism (2014)
 Rabbi of the Jerusalem College of Technology and head of its Batei Midrash (May 2015)
 Katz Prize for the Application of Halacha in Modern Society (2018)

Published works
 Shemita: From the Sources to Practical Halakha - Shiurim on the topic of Shmita, published in several editions
 Tzava: Halacha MiMekora
 Hilchot Aveilut - Halakhot From the Source
 Hilchot Shabbat - 2 volumes
 Birkat HaMazon & Zemirot Shabbat: From Halachic Sources to Practical Halacha
 Birkat HaChamah VeHilchoteha
 Hilchot Tefillin - From the Sources to Practical Halakha
 Purim - Halakha MiMekora
 Chanukah - Halakha MiMekora
 Pesach Haggadah - Shirat Miriam
 The Rimon Yom Kippur Mahzor

References

1968 births
People from Alon Shvut
Religious Zionist Orthodox rabbis
Authors of books on Jewish law
Academic staff of Jerusalem College of Technology
Yeshivat Har Etzion
Moskowitz Prize for Zionism laureates
Israeli settlers
Jewish military personnel
Orthodox rabbis
Israeli Orthodox rabbis
Living people